Fazal-e-Khuda (9 March 1941 — 4 July 2021) was a Bangladeshi poet, musician, songwriter, and administrator. He was awarded Ekushey Padak in 2023 posthumously for his contribution to music. His written song "Salam Salam Hajar Salam" ranked 12 in the 2006 top 20 BBC's list of the greatest Bengali songs of all time.

Career
Fazal-e-Khuda started his career as a  lyricist at Radio Bangladesh (now Bangladesh Betar) in 1963. He retired as a director of the organization.

Fazal-e-Khuda died on 4 July 2021 due to COVID-19 infection while undergoing treatment at Shaheed Suhrawardy Medical College & Hospital in Dhaka.

References

1941 births
2021 deaths
People from Pabna District
Bangladeshi male poets
Deaths from the COVID-19 pandemic in Bangladesh
Recipients of the Ekushey Padak